Wranå is a Swedish surname. Notable people with the surname include: 

Isabella Wranå (born 1997), Swedish curler, sister of Rasmus
Rasmus Wranå (born 1994), Swedish curler 

Swedish-language surnames
Surnames of Swedish origin